Arbor Place is a shopping mall in Douglasville, Georgia, United States. Opened in 1999, the mall features JCPenney, Macy's, Belk, Dillard's, Overstock Furniture, H&M, and Old Navy as its anchor stores, with one vacancy previously occupied by Sears. The mall is owned and managed by CBL Properties.

History
Arbor Place was developed in 1999 by CBL & Associates Properties (now CBL Properties). The original anchor stores were Bed Bath & Beyond, Old Navy, Parisian, Sears, and Borders Books & Music. An additional space was built for Uptons, but the chain went out of business before the mall opened. Arbor Place was the first retail development in Douglas County, Georgia. The unopened Uptons became a home furnishings store called Dekor in 2001, but this store liquidated after only a few months in operation. A year later, Rich's was added as well. JCPenney joined the mall in 2003, taking the place of Dekor.

On November 7, 2019, it was announced that Sears would be closing as part of a plan to close 96 stores nationwide. The store closed on February 16, 2020.

On June 4, 2020, it was announced that JCPenney would also be closing as part of a plan to close 154 stores nationwide. On July 19, 2020, the closure of the JCPenney location is cancelled. The corporate office and CBL Properties negotiated terms for a new lease.

On September 18, 2020, Bed Bath & Beyond announced that 63 locations would be closing, as the company was suffering financial issues due to the COVID-19 pandemic. These locations included Arbor Place in Douglasville.
On Sunday August 28, 2022, Conn’s Home Plus is opening a partial space in the former Sears. On February 28, 2023, Belk temporarily close the Douglasville location for one month. It will be reopen on April 1, 2023 as a Belk outlet store.

References

External links
 Arbor Place Mall official website

Buildings and structures in Douglas County, Georgia
Shopping malls established in 1999
Shopping malls in the Atlanta metropolitan area
CBL Properties
Tourist attractions in Douglas County, Georgia
1999 establishments in Georgia (U.S. state)